Jumoke Verissimo (born 26 December 1979 in Lagos) is a Nigerian poet, novelist, children's writer and critic.

Life
Jumoke was born in Lagos.  She has a master's degree in African studies (performance) from the University of Ibadan and a bachelor's degree in English literature from the Lagos State University. She has worked as an editor, sub-editor, copywriter and a freelance journalist for major newspapers such as The Guardian and NEXT. Jumoke now lives in Canada with her daughter and works as an Assistant Professor at Toronto Metropolitan University
.

Writing
The Peoples Daily describes her collection as "a bold stance of pain and other emotions, filtering through the pores of gross indifference and achieving a communal cry of retrospective protest." The Punch also describes her as, "one of those who will change the face of literature in Nigeria", after her first book, which was well-received across the country.  Her works have appeared in Migrations (Afro-Italian), Wole Soyinka ed., Voldposten 2010 (Norway), Livre d'or de Struga (Poetes du monde, sous le patronage de l'UNESCO) and many other prints and online magazines. Some of her poems are in translation in Italian, Norwegian, French, Japanese, Chinese, and Macedonian. Veissimo's 2019 novel, A Small Silence (Cassava Republic) was selected as the winner of the Aidoo-Snyder Prize for best original creative work. According to the awards committee, A Small Silence  is impressive for several reasons: its moving portrait of post-traumatic stress disorder, its believable point of view, its connections to real-world problems, its engaging depictions of everyday life, its lyrical style, and its sense of humor.

Awards and nominations
2009: Carlos Idzia Ahmad Prize, First Prize for a first book of Poetry.
2009: Anthony Agbo Prize for Poetry, Second Prize for a first book of Poetry 
2012: Recipient, Chinua Achebe Centre Fellowship, 2012
2020: Ondaatje Prize, shortlisted for A Small Silence2020: Winner of the Aidoo-Snyder Book Prize for best original creative work.

 Novel A Small Silence Cassava Republic, London, 2019 ISBN No: 9781911115793

 Poetry I Am Memory DADA Books, Lagos, 2008 ISBN No: 978-978-088-065-1The Birth of Illusion FULLPOINT, Nigeria, 2015 ISBN No: 978-978-946-697-9

 Edited Work 
Co-editor,Sọ̀rọ̀sóke: An #Endsars Anthology (Noirledge, Nigeria, 2022 ISBN No: 9789785874693

 Children's Book Grandma and the Moon's Hidden Secret, 2022  Cassava Republic, London, 2019 ISBN No: 9781913175351Àdùkẹ́, Ìyá Àgbà Àti Àṣírí Òṣùpá (Yoruba), 2022  Cassava Republic, London, 2019 ISBN No: 9781913175382

References

 External links 
Review of A Small Silence at The GuardianReview of A Small Silence at Brittle Paper''

1979 births
Living people
Yoruba women writers
Writers from Lagos
21st-century Nigerian poets
Lagos State University alumni
Yoruba poets
Nigerian women poets
21st-century Nigerian women writers